The Moment You Realize You're Going to Fall is the second studio album by American industrial rock band Black Light Burns, released on August 13, 2012 in the UK and on August 14, 2012 in the US. The first song released from the album, "I Want You To", was released in 2009, on the soundtrack to Underworld: Rise of the Lycans. "Scream Hallelujah" was released on June 1, 2012, when the full track listing and release date were also announced. Another song, "Splayed", was made available for free download on June 29.

The band released 3 different videos marked as chapters in order to promote the release of the album. The first chapter is a trailer video directed by Agata Alexander, that contains an edited version of the title track. It has also been revealed through the band's Facebook account that a video for the single "How to Look Naked" is being filmed and it was released September 14, 2012 on Vimeo.

Track listing

Bonus Tracks

Personnel
Wes Borland – vocals, guitar, bass, keyboards, synthesizers, programming, engineering
Nick Annis – additional guitars (on tracks 1–3, 8, 10 and 13)
Marshall Kilpatric – drums (on tracks 1, 2, 4, 8, 9–11, 15) and bonus track "War"
Anna Carlise – vocals (on track 13)
Jana Lou Annis – violin (on track 13)
Dave Shiffman – mixing 
Dave Donnelly – mastering

References

2012 albums
Black Light Burns albums